The 1887 San Diego mayoral election was held on November 8, 1887 to elect the mayor for San Diego. This was the first mayoral election since the position was abolished due to an 1852 city bankruptcy. William Jefferson Hunsaker was elected Mayor with a majority of the votes.

Candidates
William Jefferson Hunsaker, lawyer
Daniel C. Reed, insurance salesman

Campaign
In 1887, the City of San Diego adopted a new charter reestablishing the office of mayor for the first time in 35 years since an 1852 city bankruptcy. In the interim, the City had been run by a board of trustees appointed by the State.

On October 4, 1887, trade unions of San Diego met to nominate a slate of candidates to run for office on the platform of the Workingmen's Party of California. On the fourth ballot, William J. Hunsaker was selected as the Workingmen's candidate for mayor. His opponent, Daniel C. Reed ran as a Republican on the Citizen's ticket.

On November 8, 1887, Hunsaker was elected mayor with 53.8 percent of the vote to Reed's 46.2 percent.

Election results

References

1887
1887 California elections
1887 United States mayoral elections
19th century in San Diego
November 1887 events